Hingston Down is a hill not far from Gunnislake in Cornwall, England, United Kingdom. It is the subject of an old rhyme, due to the prolific tin mining that formerly took place in the area:

History
The hill is usually accepted as the place mentioned in an entry in the Anglo-Saxon Chronicle for 835 (corrected by scholars to 838) which says that Ecgberht king of the West Saxons defeated an army of Vikings and Cornish at the Battle of Hingston Down (Hengestdūn = "Stallion Hill").

Geology
The Hingston Down Consols mine on the hill is the type locality for the mineral Arthurite, which was discovered here. There is also a quarry on the hill, which forms the Hingston Down Quarry & Consols Site of Special Scientific Interest, noted for its mineralisation.

See also

Kit Hill Country Park

References

Battles involving the Cornish
Hills of Cornwall
Military history of Cornwall
Sites of Special Scientific Interest in Cornwall
Sites of Special Scientific Interest notified in 1995